Akureyrarvöllur (regionally also ) is a multi-use stadium in Akureyri, Iceland.  It is currently used mostly for football matches and is the former home stadium of Knattspyrnufélag Akureyrar. The stadium holds 1,645 spectators (715 seated). 

After several years with the pitch in poor condition and games being frequently moved to nearby Dalvík, a decision was taken to leave the stadium and move all home games to the clubs base in the Lundarhverfi neighborhood where a new stadium is being built.

References

External links
Akureyrarvöllur at Nordicstadiums.com

Football venues in Iceland
Buildings and structures in Northeastern Region (Iceland)
Sport in Akureyri